Microbacterium shaanxiense is a Gram-positive and non-motile bacterium from the genus Microbacterium which has been isolated from the surface of a root nodule from a soybean (Glycine max).

References

External links 

Type strain of Microbacterium shaanxiense at BacDive -  the Bacterial Diversity Metadatabase

Bacteria described in 2015
shaanxiense